The Declaration on the Sovereignty and Right to Decide of the People of Catalonia was issued on 23 January 2013. The declaration asserted that Catalonia is an autonomous entity and agrees "to initiate the process to exercise the right to decide so that the citizens of Catalonia may decide their collective political future in accordance with the following principles: democratic legitimacy, transparency, dialogue, social cohesion, Europeanism, legality, role of the Catalan Parliament and participation". The declaration was passed with 85 votes in favor, 41 against and 2 abstentions in the Parliament of Catalonia.

On 8 May 2013 this declaration was provisionally suspended by the Constitutional Court of Spain. On 25 March 2014, the same court declared the principle of sovereignty void and not constitutional and validated the other principles.

See also 
 Catalan independence
 Catalan self-determination referendum
 History of Catalonia
 Sovereignty
 Ibarretxe Plan

References

External links 
Resolution 5/X of the Parliament of Catalonia, adopting the Declaration of sovereignty and right to decide of the people of Catalonia 

2013 in law
Catalan law
Catalan independence movement
2013 in Catalonia
January 2013 events in Europe
2013 documents